Genetic studies on Neanderthal ancient DNA became possible in the late 1990s.
The Neanderthal genome project, established in 2006, presented the first fully sequenced Neanderthal genome in 2013.

Since 2005, evidence for substantial admixture of Neanderthal DNA in modern populations is accumulating.

The divergence time between the Neanderthal and modern human lineages is estimated at between 750,000 and 400,000 years ago.
The recent time is suggested by Endicott et al. (2010)
and Rieux et al. (2014).
A significantly deeper time of parallelism, combined with repeated early admixture events, was calculated by Rogers et al. (2017).

Genome sequencing

In July 2006, the Max Planck Institute for Evolutionary Anthropology and 454 Life Sciences announced that they would sequence the Neanderthal genome over the next two years. It was hoped the comparison would expand understanding of Neanderthals, as well as the evolution of humans and human brains.

In 2008 Richard E. Green et al. from Max Planck Institute for Evolutionary Anthropology in Leipzig, Germany, published the full sequence of Neanderthal mitochondrial DNA (mtDNA) and suggested "Neanderthals had a long-term effective population size smaller than that of modern humans."
In the same publication, it was disclosed by Svante Pääbo that in the previous work at the Max Planck Institute, "Contamination was indeed an issue," and they eventually realised that 11% of their sample was modern human DNA. Since then, more of the preparation work has been done in clean areas and 4-base pair 'tags' have been added to the DNA as soon as it is extracted so the Neanderthal DNA can be identified.

The project first sequenced the entire genome of a Neanderthal in 2013 by extracting it from the phalanx bone of a 50,000-year-old Siberian Neanderthal.

Among the genes shown to differ between present-day humans and Neanderthals were RPTN, SPAG17, CAN15, TTF1, and PCD16.

A visualisation map of the reference modern-human containing the genome regions with high degree of similarity or with novelty according to a Neanderthal of 50 ka has been built by Pratas et al.

Interbreeding with anatomically modern humans 

Researchers addressed the question of possible interbreeding between Neanderthals and anatomically modern humans (AMH) from the early archaeogenetic studies of the 1990s. 
As late as 2006, no evidence for interbreeding was found. As late as 2009, analysis of about one third of the full genome of the Altai individual showed "no sign of admixture". The variant of microcephalin common outside Africa, suggested to be of Neanderthal origin and responsible for rapid brain growth in humans, was not found in Neanderthals; nor was a very old MAPT variant found primarily in Europeans. However, more recent studies have concluded that gene flow between Neanderthals and AMH occurred multiple times over thousands of years.

Positive evidence for admixture was first published in May 2010. Neanderthal-inherited genetic material is found in all non-African populations and was initially reported to comprise 1 to 4 percent of the genome. This fraction was refined to 1.5 to 2.1 percent. Further analyses have found that Neanderthal gene flow is even detectable in African populations, suggesting that some variants obtained from Neanderthals posed a survival advantage.

Approximately 20 percent of Neanderthal DNA survives in modern humans; however, a single human has an average of around 2% Neanderthal DNA overall with some countries and backgrounds having a maximum of 3% per human.
Modern human genes involved in making keratin, a protein constituent of skin, hair, and nails, contain high levels of introgression. For example, the genes of approximately 66% of East Asians contain a POUF23L variant introgressed from Neanderthals, while 70% of Europeans possess an introgressed allele of BNC2. Neanderthal variants affect the risk of developing several diseases, including lupus, biliary cirrhosis, Crohn's disease, type 2 diabetes, and SARS-CoV-2. The allele of MC1R linked to red hair in Neanderthals is not found in Europeans, but is present in Taiwanese Aborigines at a frequency of 70% and at moderately high frequencies in other East Asian populations; hence, there is no evidence Neanderthals had red hair. 
While interbreeding is viewed as the most parsimonious interpretation of these genetic findings, the 2010 research of five present-day humans from different parts of the world does not rule out an alternative scenario, in which the source population of several non-African modern humans was more closely related than other Africans to Neanderthals because of ancient genetic divisions within early Hominoids.

Research since 2010 refined the picture of interbreeding between Neanderthals, Denisovans, and anatomically modern humans.
Interbreeding appears asymmetrically among the ancestors of modern-day humans, and this may explain differing frequencies of Neanderthal-specific DNA in the genomes of modern humans. Vernot and Akey (2015) concluded the greater quantity of Neanderthal-specific DNA in the genomes of individuals of East Asian descent (compared with those of European descent) cannot be explained by differences in selection. 
They suggest "two additional demographic models, involving either a second pulse of Neanderthal gene flow into the ancestors of East Asians or a dilution of Neanderthal lineages in Europeans by admixture with an unknown ancestral population" are parsimonious with their data. 
Kim and Lohmueller (2015) reached similar conclusions: " According to some researchers, the greater proportion of Neanderthal ancestry in East Asians than in Europeans is due to purifying selection is less effective at removing the so-called 'weakly-deleterious' Neanderthal alleles from East Asian populations. Computer simulations of a broad range of models of selection and demography indicate this hypothesis cannot account for the higher proportion of Neanderthal ancestry in East Asians than in Europeans. Instead, complex demographic scenarios, likely involving multiple pulses of Neanderthal admixture, are required to explain the data."

Khrameeva et al. (2014), a German-Russian-Chinese collaboration, 
compiled an elementary Neanderthal genome based on the Altai individual and three Vindjia individuals. 
This was compared to a consensus chimpanzee genome as the out-group
and to the genome of eleven modern populations (three African, three East Asian, three European). 
Beyond confirming a greater similarity to the Neanderthal genome in several non-Africans than in Africans, the study also found
a difference in the distribution of Neanderthal-derived sites between Europeans and East Asians, suggesting recent evolutionary pressures. Asian populations showed clustering in 
functional groups related to immune and haematopoietic pathways,
while Europeans showed clustering in functional groups related to the lipid catabolic process.

Kuhlwilm et al. (2016) presented evidence for AMH admixture to Neanderthals at roughly 100,000 years ago.

At minimum, research indicates three episodes of interbreeding. The first occurred with some modern humans. The second occurred after the ancestral Melanesians branched; these people seem to bred with Denisovans. The third involved Neanderthals and the ancestors of East Asians only.

2016 research indicates some Neanderthal males might not have viable male offspring with some AMH females.
This could explain the reason why no modern man has a Neanderthal Y chromosome.

2018 research indicates interbreeding between Neanderthals and modern humans led to the exposure of each species to unfamiliar viruses. Later on, the exchange of genes granted resistance to those viruses, too. 

On July 3, 2020, scientists reported finding a major genetic risk factor of the  COVID-19 virus was inherited from  archaic Neanderthals 60,000 years ago. It is estimated that 16% of people in Europe and 50% of people in south Asia have the particular sequence on chromosome III,
with 63% of Bangladeshis having these gene sequences. Africans, Middle Easterners and East Asians feature the presence of the chromosome in very negligible amounts.

Epigenetics
Complete DNA methylation maps for Neanderthal and Denisovan individuals were reconstructed in 2014. 
Differential activity of HOX cluster genes lie behind many of the anatomical differences between Neanderthals and modern humans, especially in regards to limb morphology. In general, Neanderthals possessed shorter limbs with curved bones.

See also
Human evolutionary genetics
Recent human evolution
Accretion model of Neanderthal origins

References

Ancient human genetic history
Ancient DNA (human)
Genetics